The Battle of Treviso was an engagement in 541 near Treviso, Italy, between Ostrogoths and Byzantines during the Gothic War.

In the prelude to the battle, the new Ostrogothic king Ildibad had exploited the withdrawal by Eastern Roman Emperor Justinian I of general Belisarius from Italy, easily extending his authority in Venetia and Liguria with a small but growing Gothic force. In 541, Ildibad was engaged outside Treviso by general Vitalius, the military commander of the city, whose force included a sizable number of Heruli. The battle ended with a decisive victory for Ildibad, with Vitalius barely escaping while the Heruli leader was killed. Ildibad was subsequently able to extend his authority across the entire Po Valley, but his murder by a Gepid at a palace banquet prevented him from profiting further from the victory. Theudimundus, the son of magister militum Mundus, participated in this battle, fighting for the Byzantines under Vitalius.

References

Citations

Sources

541
Treviso
Treviso
Treviso
Treviso
Treviso
540s in the Byzantine Empire